Phoenicia under Roman rule describes the Syro-Phoenician city states (in the area of modern Lebanon and northern part of northern Galilee and Acre and the Northern Coastal Plain) ruled by Rome from 64 BCE to the Muslim conquests of the 7th century. The area around Berytus (and to a lesser degree around Heliopolis) was the only Latin speaking and Romanized part of Aramaic-speaking Phoenicia.

This was one of the most prosperous periods in the history of the area that is now Lebanon. Phoenicia became one of the intellectual and economic hubs of the eastern half of the empire and a destination for merchants and intellectuals. The Romans built the temples of Baalbek, the temples at Mount Hermon, the temples of Niha and various other structures now in ruins that include smaller temples, hippodromes, baths and the Law school of Berytus.

History

The last century of Seleucid rule in Lebanon was marked by disorder and dynastic struggles. These ended in 64 BC, when the Roman general Pompey added Seleucid Syria and Lebanon to the Roman Empire.

Economic and intellectual activities flourished in Lebanon during the Pax Romana. The inhabitants of the principal Phoenician cities of Byblos, Sidon, and Tyre were granted Roman citizenship. These cities were centers of the pottery, glass, and purple dye industries; their harbors also served as warehouses for products imported from Syria, Persia, and India. They exported cedar, perfume, jewelry, wine, and fruit to Rome. This prosperity meant Phoenicia became a notable destination for intellectuals, tradesmen and merchants; even farmers, from all over the empire and especially the east.

Economic prosperity led to a revival in construction and urban development; temples and palaces were built throughout the country, as well as paved roads that linked the main cities like Heliopolis and Berytus. Indeed, starting in the last quarter of the 1st century BCE (reign of Augustus)  and over a period of two centuries (reign of Philip the Arab), the Romans built a huge temples complex in Heliopolis on a pre-existing tell dating to the PPNB, consisting of three temples: Jupiter, Bacchus and Venus. On a nearby hill, they built a fourth temple dedicated to Mercury.

Berytus was considered the most Roman city in the eastern provinces of the Roman Empire. It was one of four Roman colonies in the Syria-Phoenicia region and the only one with full Ius Italicum (meaning: exemption from imperial taxation). 

Its territory/district under Claudius reached the Bekaa valley and included Heliopolis: it was the only area mostly Latin-speaking in the Syria-Phoenicia region, because settled by Roman colonists who even promoted agriculture in the fertile lands around actual Yammoune. From the 1st century BC the Bekaa valley served as a source of grain for the Roman provinces of the Levant and even for the same Rome (today the valley makes up to 40 percent of Lebanon's arable land): Roman colonists created there even a "country district" called Pagus Augustus, where are located the famous Niha temples with Latin inscriptions.

Phoenicians would ascend to the throne of Rome during the Severan dynasty. The city of Heliopolis (now called Baalbek) was made a colonia by Septimius Severus  (193-211) in 193 AD, having been part of the territory of Berytus on the Phoenician coast since 15 BC. Work on the religious complex there lasted over a century and a half and was never completed. The dedication of the present temple ruins, the largest religious building in the entire Roman empire, dates from the reign of Septimus Severus, whose coins first show the two temples. The great courts of approach were not finished before the reigns of Caracalla (211–217 CE) and Philip the Arab (244–249 CE). In commemoration of the dedication of the new sanctuaries, Severus conferred the rights of the ius Italicum on the city. Today, only six Corinthian columns remain standing of this huge Jupiter temple.

Severus also separated the area of modern Lebanon and parts of Syria from the greater province of Syria Coele, and formed the new province of Phoenice.

Furthermore, the veterans of two Roman legions were established in the city of Berytus (actual Beirut): the fifth Macedonian and the third Gallic. The city quickly became Romanized. Large public buildings and monuments were erected and Berytus enjoyed full status as a part of the empire.

Under the Romans, Berytus was enriched by the dynasty of Herod the Great, and was made a colonia, Colonia Iulia Augusta Felix Berytus, in 14 BC. Beirut's school of law was widely known at the time. Two of Rome's most famous jurists, Papinian and Ulpian, both natives of Phoenicia, taught at the law school under the Severan emperors. When Justinian assembled his Pandects in the 6th century, a large part of the corpus of laws were derived from these two jurists, and Justinian recognized the school as one of the three official law schools of the empire in 533 AD.

Upon the death of Theodosius I in AD 395, the empire was divided in two: the eastern or Byzantine part with its capital at Constantinople, and the western part with its capital at Ravenna. Under the Byzantine Empire, intellectual and economic activities in Beirut, Tyre, and Sidon continued to flourish for more than a century. However, in the sixth century a series of earthquakes demolished the temples of Baalbek and destroyed the city of Beirut, leveling its famous law school and killing nearly 30,000 inhabitants. To these natural disasters were added the abuses and corruptions prevailing at that time in the empire. Heavy tributes and religious dissension produced disorder and confusion. Furthermore, the ecumenical councils of the fifth and sixth centuries AD were unsuccessful in settling religious disagreements. 
This turbulent period weakened the empire and made it easy prey to the newly converted Muslim Arabs of the Arabian Peninsula.

Roman Temples in Lebanon

Today one of the best examples of Roman Temple architecture is in Lebanon at the ruins of Baalbek.

The Roman temple sites in Lebanon can be divided into three main groups. First, the Bekaa valley north of the Beirut-Damascus road. Second, the area south of the same road, including the Wadi al-Taym and the western flank of Mount Hermon. Third, the area west of a line drawn along the ridge of Mount Lebanon. In the coastal area of Lebanon there are not many Roman ruins.

Agrippa greatly favoured the city of Berytus, and adorned it with a splendid theatre and amphitheatre, beside baths and porticoes, inaugurating them with games and spectacles of every kind, including shows of gladiators. 

In two hundred and fifty years – from Augustus to Philip the Arab – were made all the Roman temples, with a very similar design: they show the golden era of Roman rule in Lebanon.

In the first century the worldwide famous temples in the area of Heliopolis (actual Baalbek) started to be built, using the nearby quarries with famous ""Monoliths". The Temple of Jupiter in Heliopolis (in a complex area called even Sanctuary of Heliopolitan Zeus) was the biggest pagan temple in the classical world.
 

 
The presence of a huge quarry was one of the reasons for the Roman decision to create a huge "Great Court" of a big pagan temple complex in this mountain site, located at nearly 1100 meters of altitude and on the eastern Borders of the Roman Empire: it took three centuries to create this colossal Roman paganism's temple complex.
 
Under Constantine the Great Christianity was declared officially the religion of the Roman empire and the pagan Temples started to be neglected. Later the Byzantines used some materials from the abandoned temples

Gallery

See also
 Phoenicia under Babylonian rule
 Phoenicia under Hellenistic rule
 History of ancient Lebanon

References

Bibliography

 Beydoun, Ahmad. Le Liban, une histoire disputée: identité et temps dans l'histoire libanaise contemporaine Beyrouth, Publications de l'Université Libanaise, 1984.
 Carter, Terry & Dunston, Lara. Libano  Torino, EDT, 2004. 
 Hall, Linda J. Roman Berytus: Beirut in late antiquity. Psychology Press. London, 2004 
 Sartre, Maurice. Les provinces de Méditerranée orientale d'Auguste aux Sévères. Points. Paris, 1997.

External links 
360 Panorama of the Temples of Baalbek
The monuments of Baalbek in panorama photography
 Video of Roman ruins in Lebanon

Lebanon in the Roman era
Provinces of the Roman Empire
Ancient Lebanon
Roman Syria
History of Phoenicia